Chrysophyllum ucuquirana-branca is a tree in the family Sapotaceae, native to tropical South America.

Description
Larger trees feature buttresses. The brown bark is scaly. Fascicles feature up to 20 greenish flowers.

Distribution and habitat
Chrysophyllum ucuquirana-branca is native to Colombia, Venezuela and northern Brazil. Its habitat is in rainforest.

References

ucuquirana-branca
Flora of Colombia
Flora of Venezuela
Flora of North Brazil
Plants described in 1961
Taxa named by André Aubréville
Taxa named by François Pellegrin